Eratigena balearica is a species of spider in the genus Eratigena.

Info
Distribution: Balearic Islands

References
 Eratigena balearica at the World Spider Catalog

Spiders of Europe
Spiders described in 1978